Garth Smith (born Garth Davies, 10 December 1955) and sometimes credited as Garth, was known for being one of the bassists of the Bolton formed punk rock band, Buzzcocks.

Biography
Garth was born in the Lancashire town of Tyldesley on Saturday 10 December 1955. He was named after the village of Garth in mid Wales, near to the town of Builth Wells where his mother was born and raised.

Smith was the original bassist of the band, playing in their first show in the Bolton Institute of Technology, where the other founders of the band, guitarist Pete Shelley and vocalist Howard Devoto, were students, on 1 April 1976.

He rejoined the band after Devoto left and Shelley took the lead vocalist role, around March 1977, when the band played gigs again. The band recorded and released some material with him, such as The Roxy London WC2 (June 1977), a various artists compilation album of bands who played live at The Roxy; Buzzcocks live at the Roxy album recorded in April 1977, and plays on Time's Up" on "Short Circuit: Live at the Electric Circus" the album that featured the first Joy Division's live recording, he also took part in the first Peel sessions, did the White Riot Tour and recorded both songs on the "Orgasm Addict" single. On 8 October 1977 he was expelled from the band, due to his alcoholism after Buzzcocks had performed at Mr. George's in Coventry.

He moved to New York City and by 1980, he joined Dirty Looks.

During the late 1980s, Smith played bass for the Manchester based band, Temper Temper, fronted by David Aldred. Smith played bass on their debut album, History of England.

Since then, little of his whereabouts are known. In 1988, he sent a condolence card to Pete Shelley's mother, Margaret, on the death of Pete's father John, whom Garth thought to be a great man. As of 2017, he supports Tyldesley Rugby Union Club and Wigan Athletic F.C. . Garth currently plays bass in a Tyldesley-based band, Young Once with Tony and Pete. 
He is also a member of the Lancashire 'Supergroup' Moondogs, comprising lead vocalist Steve Roden and drummer Chris Webster of Crayven, Tony Wragg – the main voice with Young Once – and Chris Ratcliffe of The Covertones, musician without portfolio on sax, keyboards, guitar and vocals. Garth plays double bass with this 1950s good time band.

References

1955 births
Living people
Buzzcocks members
English bass guitarists
English male guitarists
Male bass guitarists
People from Tyldesley